The Burmese mullet (Sicamugil hamiltonii) is a species of freshwater ray-finned fish, a mullet belonging to the family Mugilidae. It is the only species in the genus Sicamugil. It is found in the drainage systems of the Sittang and Irrawaddy rivers in Myanmar.

Etymology
The Mullet is named in honor of Francis Hamilton-Buchanan (1762-1829).

References

Mugilidae
Taxa named by Francis Day
Fish described in 1870